Antonieta Mónica Xavier Yelpo (Montevideo, 16 December 1956) is a Uruguayan politician and medical doctor with a postgraduate degree in cardiology. 

She was the President of the leftist coalition Frente Amplio between 2012 and 2015 and is a serving in the Senate of Uruguay. Xavier was born into a family with socialist roots. She completed all her studies in public education. In 1975, she became a student in the Faculty of Medicine of the University of the Republic, and graduated in 1985.

References

1956 births
Living people
People from Montevideo
Uruguayan cardiologists
Broad Front (Uruguay) politicians
Uruguay Assembly politicians
University of the Republic (Uruguay) alumni
21st-century Uruguayan women politicians
21st-century Uruguayan politicians